Eulpaso (을파소, 乙巴素) (died 203) was the Guksang (Prime Minister) of Goguryeo under its 9th ruler King Gogukcheon.

Eulpaso was a native of Jwa-mul village near the Amnok River before his elevation to the position of Prime Minister. He was said to have had a minister among his ancestors a century and a half earlier, under King Yuri (r.19 BC - AD 18), but by the time of King Gogukcheon he was farming, probably in the sense of managing an estate rather than himself guiding the plough, since he was literate and had enough connections to have a "reputation" for wisdom. King Gogukcheon's sudden shift from an aristocratic to meritocratic style of government resulted in the discovering of many talented people throughout the kingdom. Among these selected individuals was Anryu, who was a student and neighbor of Eulpaso. Anryu told the king about Eulpaso, and Samguk Sagi says that the king summoned him to the capital, and eventually gave him the position of Prime Minister in 191.

Eulpaso helped the king rule the kingdom wisely, but was constantly attacked politically by jealous nobles, for it was precisely their power the King had brought him in to undermine. The king threatened them with extermination if they continued to disobey, and since he had begun his reforms by executing or banishing the followers of his maternal relatives for encroaching on royal power, they believed him and quieted down. Eulpaso died in 203, during the reign of King Sansang, the successor of King Gogukcheon.

See also
 Three Kingdoms of Korea
 Goguryeo

References

203 deaths
Goguryeo people
3rd-century heads of government
2nd-century heads of government
Year of birth unknown